Trachyderes armatus is a species of beetle in the family Cerambycidae. It was described by Monne & Martins in 1973.

References

Trachyderini
Beetles described in 1973